Trinity Catholic High School was a Roman Catholic high school in Newton, Massachusetts.  It was located in the Roman Catholic Archdiocese of Boston.
The school was a co-educational and college preparatory school founded in 1894.  The school shut down in 2012, at which point the building that housed its functions was taken over by Cambridge Education Group and established as CATS Academy, a private non-religious school, catering mostly to international students.

Advisory program 
The advisory program provided daily contact with a faculty member who offered academic advisement, college preparation tools, and formation for life choices.

115th anniversary celebration
In October 2009, the school celebrated its 115th anniversary with a fundraising event that highlighted the school's history, accomplishments, and current and former students. All of the proceeds went to the funding of scholarships for future students. The event featured many prominent community guests including the former mayor of Newton, David Cohen, the Newton Community Chorus, and the current Boston College head hockey coach, Jerry York, who gave a speech. Other speakers included current students and faculty.

Extracurricular activities 
Some of the activities that have been available to students are:
• Academic Decathlon • Art/Literary Magazine • Baseball • Basketball • Big Brothers/Big Sisters • Book Club • Campus Ministry – Emmaus • Camden, NJ Service-Learning • Chess Club  • Cheerleading • Choir • Debate Club  • Dominican Republic Service-Learning (April Break) • Drama Club  • Film Club • Football • Forensics Club • Game Club • Golf • Hockey  • Multi-Cultural Club • National Honor Society • Performing Arts Club • Photography Club • Poetry Club • Publications/Yearbook • Recording Studio Club • SAT Prep Club • Student Government • Soccer • Softball • Track and Field • Ultimate Frisbee Club • Volleyball • Guitar Club • Media Studies (TC Talk) • Student Leadership Team

Memberships and associations
 Member of Association of Independent Schools of New England (AISNE)
 Member of National Catholic Education Association (NCEA)
 Association for Supervision & Curriculum Development (ASCD)
 Accredited Member of the New England Association of Schools and Colleges (NEASC) (2003)

Notes and references

External links 
Trinity Catholic High School Official Website

Roman Catholic Archdiocese of Boston
Defunct Catholic secondary schools in Massachusetts
Schools in Middlesex County, Massachusetts
Educational institutions established in 1894
Educational institutions disestablished in 2012
1894 establishments in Massachusetts